The Copa Ecuador, officially known as Copa FEF Ecuador, is a knockout football competition in men's domestic Ecuadorian football organized by the Ecuadorian Football Federation that started in 2018. Its creation was approved on 18 May 2018, considering that the governing body would stop organizing the first and second tier championships starting from 2019 and that it was needed to both expand the scope of Ecuadorian football to more places within the country and generate new economic resources for the FEF and the lower tiers of domestic football, represented by the provincial associations.

The winners qualify for the first stage of the following year's Copa Libertadores and the Supercopa Ecuador against the Serie A champions.

Format
For its first edition in 2019, the competition involved 48 teams and was divided into seven rounds. The first round was played by 22 teams from the provincial associations and 2 amateur teams, which were drawn into 12 two-legged ties. The 12 winners qualified for the second round, where they were drawn into six two-legged ties, with the winners advancing to the round of 32.

In the round of 32, the 6 winners from the previous round were joined by the 16 Serie A and 10 Serie B teams, who played in 16 two-legged ties with the winners advancing to the round of 16, from where the competition advanced to the quarter-finals, semi-finals, and final.

For 2021, the FEF prepared a change of format with the competition having a preliminary stage involving the 10 Serie B teams and the 22 provincial champions, which would be drawn into 16 double-legged ties with the winners joining the 16 Serie A teams at the round of 32. However, this format had to be implemented starting from 2022 as the 2021 edition was cancelled due to the effects of the COVID-19 pandemic.

Results

Performance by club

References

National association football cups
Football in Ecuador